Gronocarus is a genus of May beetles and junebugs in the family Scarabaeidae. There are at least three described species in Gronocarus.

Species
These three species belong to the genus Gronocarus:
 Gronocarus automnalis Schaeffer
 Gronocarus autumnalis Schaeffer, 1927 (lobed spiny burrowing beetle)
 Gronocarus inornatus Skelley, 2005 (lobeless spiny burrowing beetle)

References

Further reading

 
 
 
 
 

Melolonthinae
Articles created by Qbugbot
Taxa named by Charles Frederic August Schaeffer